Ngie may be,

Ngie language
Kwane a Ngie